Bunchrew railway station served the village of Bunchrew, Highland, Scotland from 1862 to 1964 on the Inverness and Ross-shire Railway.

History 
The station opened on 11 June 1862 by the Inverness and Aberdeen Junction Railway.

The station was host to a LMS caravan from 1936 to 1939.

The station closed to passengers on 13 June 1960 and to goods traffic on 27 January 1964.

References

External links 

Disused railway stations in Highland (council area)
Former Highland Railway stations
Railway stations in Great Britain opened in 1862
Railway stations in Great Britain closed in 1960
1862 establishments in Scotland
1964 disestablishments in Scotland